Maanpää is a district of the city of Turku, in Finland. It is located in the western part of the island of Hirvensalo, off the city's coastline. The district also includes some small islands to the west of Hirvensalo.

The current population of Maanpää is 107, and it is increasing at an annual rate of 4.67%. 18.69% of the district's population are under 15 years old, while 14.95% are over 65. The district's linguistic makeup is 94.39% Finnish, 4.67% Swedish, and 0.93% other.

See also 
 Districts of Turku
 Districts of Turku by population

Districts of Turku